Humerana miopus, also known as the Khao Wang frog or three-striped frog, is a frog that was identified in 1918. This species is known from southern Thailand and Peninsular Malaysia, and it is locally common.

Its dorsal colour is greyish-brown to orange-red above; the dorsolateral folds lighter. Diagonal lines on the back blackish; upper lip white; limbs with more or less distinct dark cross-bars; back of thighs marbled black and grey.

References

Frank and Ramus, 1995, Compl. Guide Scient. Common Names Amph. Rept. World: 108
Frost, Grant, Faivovich, Bain, Haas, Haddad, de Sá, Channing, Wilkinson, Donnellan, Raxworthy, Campbell, Blotto, Moler, Drewes, Nussbaum, Lynch, Green, and Wheeler, 2006, Bull. Am. Mus. Nat. Hist., 297: 368

External links
Amphibian and Reptiles of Peninsular Malaysia - Humerana miopus

miopus
Amphibians of Malaysia
Amphibians of Thailand
Amphibians described in 1918